The Green Bridge is a bridge over the Neris River in Vilnius, Lithuania, that connects the city center with the district of Šnipiškės. The original 16th-century bridge was the oldest bridge in Vilnius.

History

The first bridge dated from 1536. It stood closer to the present-day Mindaugas Bridge. It was a wooden covered bridge with brick and stone piers. It had a second floor with apartments for toll collectors. Because its builder Ulryk Hozjusz wanted to recoup the cost by collecting tolls, Grand Duke Sigismund the Old granted him a privilege prohibiting others from building any other bridges between Kernavė and Bistrica (Быстрыца in Belarus) or to offer other crossing services between Verkiai and Paneriai. The bridge was burned by retreating Lithuanian Army commanded by Janusz Radziwiłł after the Battle of Vilnius (1655).

However, an early spring and ice jam destroyed the piers. Therefore, the old piers from the first bridge were reused and the second bridge was completed in 1679. 

In 1739 another wooden bridge was erected and painted green. Since then this crossing has been known as the Green Bridge. In 1789 a new plan for a brick bridge was prepared by Laurynas Gucevičius, but the builders selected another proposal. The construction was supervised by Marcin Knackfus. The project was not successful as the bridge burned in 1791. It was rebuilt according to a plan by Michael Schulz in 1805, but it was burned again on orders from Michael Andreas Barclay de Tolly during the French invasion of Russia of 1812.

The bridge was rebuilt in 1827–1829. A steel bridge was designed by Nikolai Belelubsky and completed in 1894. It survived World War I, but was blown up by the Wehrmacht in 1944. The present-day bridge was completed in 1952 and named after Soviet General Ivan Chernyakhovsky. After Lithuania's declaration of independence in 1990, the bridge was returned to its historical name.

Old sculptures
During the Soviet occupation, in 1952, the bridge was decorated with four sets of sculptures of Soviet realism. After the restoration of independence, the sculptures were a subject of heated public debate whether they represent a form of art or Soviet propaganda which should be removed.

The sculptures were deteriorating and often vandalized. In 2013, Artūras Zuokas, then mayor of Vilnius, announced a plan to refurbish the statues without removing them from the bridge, and to add a commemorative plaque about Soviet repressions below the sculptures as a compromise. However, in July 2015 the statues were removed, citing health and safety reasons. Vilnius Mayor Remigijus Šimašius claimed: "The statues represent a lie. Their heroic portrayal of the Soviet people – that is all a lie ... The statues are a mockery of the real people who had to live during the Soviet period." Later, Šimašius announced that the decision to remove the sculptures is permanent. Various art installations have been placed on the bridge since.

In March 2016, the First Council of the Assessment of Immovable Cultural Heritage stripped the bridge and the statues of legal protection they enjoyed as artifacts of cultural value, making the restoration and return of the statues to the bridge unlikely. Members of the council expressed hope, however, that the statues would end up in a museum where they can be preserved and presented in the appropriate context.

In August 2016, a Lithuanian official sharply criticized a newly issued Russian commemorative coin depicting one of the banished statues – "Guarding Peace" – in connection with the Soviet liberation of Vilnius in 1944. Rolandas Kacinskas, director of the Foreign Ministry's Political Department, said: "We have no doubts about the role and place of the Red Army in the history of Lithuania. ... The issue of the coins proves once again that Russia is not ready for the historic truth about the Soviet occupation."

References

Bridges in Vilnius
Road bridges in Lithuania
Former toll bridges